Templenoe GAA (Irish: CLG Teampall Nua) is a Gaelic Athletic Association club from Templenoe in County Kerry, Ireland.  The club competes as a joint divisional side with other clubs from the Kenmare area like Tuosist GAA in the county championship and as an individual club in other competitions.  Hurling was by far the stronger of the two codes until the 1920s. However, since then Gaelic football has taken pride of place and hurling is no longer played in the club.  The club was founded in 1933 but did not affiliate to the GAA until 1938.

History
The first club meeting was held in 1933 in the Merino House. Dan O'Reilly became the club's first chairman and P.D.M. O'Sullivan became the first secretary. Joe O'Neill was elected treasurer that day and stayed treasurer until 1966.  In 1958 Templenoe merged with another Templenoe club from the Blackwater area, which was founded in 1942.

The club played in the 1903 Kerry Senior Hurling Championship. In their only outing they suffered a big loss to Tralee Celtic.

Templenoe did not have its own pitch until 1954 when they acquired a field. In the 1970s they leveled this field and dressing rooms and toilets were added in 1991.  The club had many victories over the years in Kenmare district board competitions but the highlight of the playing successes was the winning the Kerry Novice Football Championship in 1973 and the Kerry Junior Football Championship in 1975. Nine Templenoe players won Senior Kerry County Championship medals with Kenmare District in 1974.

Finnegan Cup
The 4 clubs in the Kenmare District play for the Finnegan Cup  in the Kenmare district board championship.
The Kenmare District is the smallest such district in Kerry.
The 4 clubs are Templenoe GAA, Tuosist GAA, Kenmare GAA and Kilgarvan GAA.

Achievements
 Kerry Intermediate Football Championship (1) - 2019 (Runners-Up in 1988, 2016, 2017)
 Munster Intermediate Club Football Championship Winners (1) - 2019
Kerry Junior Football Championship (2) - 1975, 2015
Munster Junior Club Football Championship (1) - 2015
All-Ireland Junior Club Football Championship (1) - 2016
Kerry Novice Football Championship (2) - 1973, 2013
Co. Novice shield champions: (3) - 2002, 2005, 2010
Kerry County Senior Football League Division 2 Winners - 2015
Kerry County Senior Football League Division 3 Winners - 2014
Kerry County Senior Football League Division 4 Winners - 1994, 2012
Kerry County Senior Football League Division 5 Winners - 1993, 2011

Notable players
 Killian Spillane, Kerry Senior Footballer
 Pat Spillane, Kerry Senior Footballer
 Tom Spillane, Kerry Senior Footballer
 Mick Spillane, Kerry Senior Footballer
 Tadhg Morley, Kerry Senior Footballer

References

External links
Official Templenoe GAA Club website

Gaelic games clubs in County Kerry
Gaelic football clubs in County Kerry